"Broken" is a song written by Italian adult alternative singer Elisa from her fourth studio album, Lotus (2003), it was released on 24 October 2003 as the album's lead single. The song was also includes in the Greatest hits Soundtrack '96–'06.

Music video
The music video for the song was filmed in October 2003 by Luca Guadagnino.

Track listings
CD-EP
"Broken" – 4:20
"(Sittin' on) the Dock of the Bay" – 2:52
"Redemption Song" – 5:23

Chart performance

References

2003 singles
Elisa (Italian singer) songs
Songs written by Elisa (Italian singer)
Rock ballads
English-language Italian songs
2003 songs